Powers is an American streaming television series developed by Brian Michael Bendis and Charlie Huston for PlayStation Network. It is based on the comic book series of the same name by Bendis and Michael Avon Oeming. The show depicts humans who have been granted special abilities, known as "Powers", that remain hidden until adulthood. The show centers around the character Christian Walker, who was once a hero that had the ability to fly and was known as Diamond.

The series was PlayStation Network's first venture into scripted original programming, and premiered on March 10, 2015, with the final episode of the first season being released on April 28, 2015. It was renewed for a second season of 10 episodes, which premiered on May 31, 2016, and was released through July 19, 2016. The series was canceled in August of the same year.

Overview
In a world where humans and superheroes called "Powers" co-exist, a former Power, Christian Walker, has reinvented himself as a homicide detective after his own powers were taken from him. He and his partner Deena Pilgrim work for the Powers Division of the Los Angeles Police Department, investigating crimes involving superhumans, who are at once crimefighting heroes and pop celebrities managed by specialized advertising agencies.

Cast

Main
 Sharlto Copley as Christian Walker, formerly known as Diamond – a detective in the Powers Division. Christian was once an indestructable superhero with the ability to fly, and in his identity of Diamond was one of the most acclaimed heroes. However, his powers were later taken from him by his previous mentor, Wolfe. Now Christian uses his experience to help the Powers Division stop destructive Powers. 
 Susan Heyward as Deena Pilgrim – Christian's partner in the Powers Division. Her father is a successful retired policeman whom everyone admires. 
 Noah Taylor as Johnny Royalle (season 1) – another protégé of Wolfe, and former friend of Christian Walker. He owns the Here and Gone Club (which takes the name from his own motto) where younger Powers often gather. He has the power to teleport at will both himself and objects or people with which he's in contact. His power can prove extremely lethal when used to teleport away parts of a person's body, or the air in a room. Royalle recently synthesized a mysterious substance called Sway, which he plans to give to young Powers to help them enhance their abilities.
 Olesya Rulin as Calista Secor – a wayward girl, possibly homeless. She is a "wannabe" as she hangs around Powers, believing her own powers will awaken someday. She intends to use her powers on her abusive father for hurting her mother. She befriends both Christian and Royalle.
 Adam Godley as Captain Emile Cross – the head of Powers Division. He dislikes all Powers and often argues with Christian and Deena.
 Max Fowler as Krispin Stockley – the teenage son of Christian's deceased former police partner. Krispin feels that the more unstable Powers should be held accountable for their mistakes and goes rage hunting after Powers along with Marigold forming ChaoticChic only to die and ironically come back from the dead as a Power with immortality.
 Michelle Forbes as Janis Sandusky, a.k.a. RetroGirl (season 1) – a very popular, world-renowned Power who dated Christian when they were young and on the same team. They became estranged after Christian lost his powers. RetroGirl's powers include superhuman strength, invulnerability and flight. She's still active as a heroine and celebrity, aiming to use her powers for humanitarian reasons, as in the relief and containment of natural disasters.
 Eddie Izzard as "Big Bad" Wolfe (season 1) – possibly the most powerful and dangerous Power ever born, Wolfe has the ability to drain the life force of both humans and Powers at will, becoming stronger and stronger in the process and fueling a multitude of powers which include extreme strength, speed, and massive regeneration. He is responsible for Christian's loss of powers and is particularly eager to consume Powers, who fuel his ability exponentially. After his capture, Wolfe has been routinely lobotomized in order to keep his powers in check. Triphammer stated that all Wolfe's powers stem from extreme cellular regeneration.
 Michael Madsen as Patrick, a.k.a. SuperShock (season 2) – a three centuries old Power hero who returns from a 40-year retirement following the death of RetroGirl. He was part of the famous Unity team along with RetroGirl and Cobalt Knight, and may be the most powerful Power alive.

Recurring 
 Logan Browning as Zora – a blooming Power kid with the ability to manipulate light. She admires Christian and is pushed by her management into trying to become the next Power big thing.
 Andrew Sensenig as Harley Cohen, a.k.a. Triphammer – a non-powered hero, double amputee, and scientific genius who designed a suit of state-of-the-art armor to fight crime. A former member of the superhero team composed by Christian and RetroGirl, he now watches over the Powers prison and has built a device to drain the superhuman powers. Following RetroGirl's death, he becomes concerned with his legacy and inspiring a new generation of Powers.
 Aaron Farb as Simons (season 1) – Royalle's assistant. He has the power to make multiple copies of himself, each with their own thoughts and personalities. He commonly uses his power to help Royalle, which includes running his club and assisting with his plans.
 Claire Bronson as Candace Stockley (season 1) – Krispin's mother who's a good friend of Christian. She works as a publicist at PAR Agency for powers and takes Zora as a client.
 Justice Leak as Kutter – a detective in Powers Division. He is friends with Christian and respects him, though they often butt heads.
 Nicky Buggs as Eva Hamdam (season 1) – RetroGirl's personal assistant and confidante.
 Jeryl Prescott as Golden (season 1) – a member of Powers Division. She is friends with both Deena and Christian.
 Shelby Steel as Marigold Wygant, better known by her online handle Chaotic Chick – a girl who Krispin meets while playing a Powers-based online game. Like Krispin, she feels that Powers should be held accountable for their mistakes and forms ChaoticChic with him, after a Powers battle resulted in the death of her cousin.  
 Michael Lowry as Craig Sherman – a PAR Agency publicist who works for Zora and RetroGirl. 
 Charmin Lee as Patrice LeGarde (season 1) – Johny Royalle's lawyer.
 Bianca Amato as Delia Alexander (season 1) – a newscaster who hosts a very popular news show called "One on One with Delia Alexander".
 Jannette Sepwa as Paola Ruiz (season 1) – Zora's assistant and lawyer.
 Leander Suleiman as Mack (season 1) – A member of Powers Division. She is partnered with Argento and attempts to get him to get back in the dating game.
 David Ury as Dr. Death – a mortician who works for Powers Division. He does not get along with Deena.  
 Enrico Colantoni as Senator Bailey Brown, a.k.a. The Cobalt Knight (season 2) – a retired hero turned senator who has a hard stance on Powers. He was part of the Unity team along with RetroGirl and SuperShock, but quit to go into politics.
 Tricia Helfer as FBI Special Agent Angela Lange, formerly known by her hero name Lynx (season 2) – a werecat Power hero-turned criminal-turned rehabilitated government agent. She works alongside partner Schlag as an intermediary between Powers Division and the federal government. Angela is also a former flame of Christian.
 Timothy Douglas Perez as FBI Special Agent Schlag (season 2) – the silent, granite-skinned Power who's the partner of Lange and tends to act as the muscle of the pair.
 Jason Wesley as Terrance Pelham (season 2) – a TV reporter for Powers That Be (PTB) News.
 Teri Wyble as Nicole Glantz (season 2) – an investigative reporter for PTB News who's willing to do what needs to be done to move forward in her career.
 Azie Tesfai as Dr. Michelle Marrs (season 2) – the new coroner at Powers divisions, she's amicable and excitable towards powers and immediately becomes friends with Walker and Pilgrim. 
 Robin Spriggs as Morrison, a.k.a. The Ghost (season 2) – an apparently ageless Level-10 Power and master manipulator who is endowed with super strength and the ability to disappear. He is the longtime nemesis of SuperShock.
 Wil Wheaton as Conrad Moody (season 2) – the eccentric toymaker and CEO of Colossal Fun who is obsessed with the idea of RetroGirl.
 Raul Casso as Sgt. Tiberio Martinez (season 2) – an amputee USMC veteran and MMA fighter recruited by Harley to test his prosthetic technology, who soon becomes his protégé on the road to becoming a tech-powered hero himself.
 Matthew Yang King as THX (season 2) – a Hack lieutenant who uses implants to change his face. The cyborg's hardware fatally crashes before he can reveal who hired him.

Episodes

Season 1 (2015)

Season 2 (2016)

Production

Development for FX
Sony Pictures had optioned the series for film production in 2001. Powers television show began the development on FX in 2009, with Brian Michael Bendis as the writer of the pilot for the show. In February 2011, a greenlit pilot of the show scripted by Charles H. Eglee was announced as a co-production by Sony Pictures Television and FX Networks. Soon after, Charles S. Dutton became the first cast member in May when he signed on to play Captain Cross. Imminent filming in Chicago within weeks was announced in June.  The following week, Lucy Punch was cast as Deena Pilgrim. Katee Sackhoff had campaigned for the part. Although FX was rumored to be courting Kyle Chandler for the part of Walker, Jason Patric was cast in the part. Later in June, Carly Foulkes was cast as RetroGirl and Bailee Madison as Calista.

Filming on the pilot began in Chicago in early July 2011 and ended in early August. In November, FX began to retool and reshoot the Powers pilot. Bendis wrote at the time that the reshoots were planned for January and were "all about tone and clarity". In April 2012, more scripts were ordered and writing continued, but reshoots and recasting were being discussed by the network.

Move to PlayStation Network
Instead of premiering on FX, Powers became the first original television series for the PlayStation Network, and was announced to stream exclusively on PlayStation consoles in December 2014.  That year in the summer, Susan Heyward, Max Fowler and Adam Godley were cast as Deena Pilgrim, Krispin Stockley and Captain Cross. Eddie Izzard, Noah Taylor and Olesya Rulin were cast in the roles of "Big Bad" Wolfe, Johnny Royalle and Calista. Sharlto Copley was cast as Christian Walker and Michelle Forbes as RetroGirl. Mario Lopez guest stars in the pilot episode as the host of Extra wondering about Walker's current whereabouts.

The series was renewed for a second season in May 2015, with the second season consisting of 10 episodes. It was subsequently canceled in August 2016, after premiering in May of the same year.

Release
A trailer for Powers premiered at New York Comic-Con in Autumn 2014. Marking PlayStation Network's first venture into scripted original programming, the series debuted on March 10, 2015. The final episode of the first season was released on April 28, 2015. The pilot episode is available for free for people in the United States on YouTube, and the entire first season was available on Crackle from November 2015, until May 2016. 

The second season of 10 episodes premiered on May 31, 2016, with the final episode released on July 19, 2016.

Reception
The first season has received mixed reviews from critics. On Rotten Tomatoes it has a score of 48% based on 29 critic reviews, with an average score of 4.6/10. The critical consensus reads: "The interplay between the characters lacks spark, but the detailed world-building of Powers shows potential".  On Metacritic, it has a score of 51 out of 100, indicating "mixed or average reviews".

References

External links
 
 Powers at Crackle
  
 Powers at The Futon Critic

2015 American television series debuts
2016 American television series endings
American action television series
English-language television shows
PlayStation Network
Science fantasy television series
Serial drama television series
American superhero television series
Television shows based on Marvel Comics
Television series based on works by Brian Michael Bendis
Television series by Sony Pictures Television
Television series based on Image Comics